Barbara Olshansky is an American human rights lawyer.

The Case for Impeachment

Olshansky is author with Dave Lindorff of The Case for Impeachment: The Legal Argument for Removing President George W. Bush from Office.

Olshansky and Lindorff include as rationales for impeachment in The Case for Impeachment

Recipient of Matthew Diaz's leak
Olshansky was the recipient of a document leaked by Lieutenant Commander Matthew Diaz, that later lead to his court martial, detention, and discharge.
The efforts of the Center for Constitutional Rights were impaired by the Bush administration's policy of withholding the captives' identities.  Diaz had met Olshansky during a visit to Guantanamo, and he sent her a list in an unmarked greeting card.  The list provided by Diaz contained the names of 550 captives.

Olshansky suspected the list might have been classified, so she contacted Federal authorities.

Director of the International Justice Network

After leaving the Center for Constitutional Rights Olshansky was hired as director of the International Justice Network.

Academia

In 2007 Olshanksy was appointed the Leah Kaplan Visiting Professor in Human Rights at Stanford University's Law School.

In Spring 2010, Olshansky joined the faculty at the University of Maryland School of Law.  She will be teaching the International Clinic.

References

Year of birth missing (living people)
Living people
American women writers
American legal scholars
Place of birth missing (living people)
University of Maryland, College Park faculty
American women legal scholars
21st-century American women